Habibabad (also Romanized as Ḩabībābād) is a village in Sornabad Rural District, Hamaijan District, Sepidan County, Fars Province, Iran. At the 2006 census, its population was 80, in 20 families.

References 

Populated places in Sepidan County